Rémy Landeau (8 October 1859 – 1934) was a French painter. His work was part of the painting event in the art competition at the 1928 Summer Olympics.

References

1859 births
1934 deaths
20th-century French painters
20th-century French male artists
French male painters
Olympic competitors in art competitions
People from Sèvres